Viral entry is the earliest stage of infection in the viral life cycle, as the virus comes into contact with the host cell and introduces viral material into the cell.  The major steps involved in viral entry are shown below.  Despite the variation among viruses, there are several shared generalities concerning viral entry.

Reducing cellular proximity 
How a virus enters a cell is different depending on the type of virus it is. A virus with a nonenveloped capsid enters the cell by attaching to the attachment factor located on a host cell. It then enters the cell by endocytosis or by making a hole in the membrane of the host cell and inserting its viral genome.

Cell entry by enveloped viruses is more complicated. Enveloped viruses enter the cell by attaching to an attachment factor located on the surface of the host cell. They then enter by endocytosis or a direct membrane fusion event. The fusion event is when the virus membrane and the host cell membrane fuse together allowing a virus to enter. It does this by attachment – or adsorption – onto a susceptible cell; a cell which holds a receptor that the virus can bind to.  The receptors on the viral envelope effectively become connected to complementary receptors on the cell membrane.  This attachment causes the two membranes to remain in mutual proximity, favoring further interactions between surface proteins.  This is also the first requisite that must be satisfied before a cell can become infected.  Satisfaction of this requisite makes the cell susceptible.  Viruses that exhibit this behavior include many enveloped viruses such as HIV and herpes simplex virus.

These basic ideas extend to viruses that infect bacteria, known as bacteriophages (or simply phages). Typical phages have long tails used to attach to receptors on the bacterial surface and inject their viral genome.

Overview
Prior to entry, a virus must attach to a host cell. Attachment is achieved when specific proteins on the viral capsid or viral envelope bind to specific proteins called receptor proteins on the cell membrane of the target cell. A virus must now enter the cell, which is covered by a phospholipid bilayer, a cell's natural barrier to the outside world.  The process by which this barrier is breached depends upon the virus.  Types of entry are:

 Membrane fusion or Hemifusion state: The cell membrane is punctured and made to further connect with the unfolding viral envelope.
 Endocytosis: The host cell takes in the viral particle through the process of endocytosis, essentially engulfing the virus like it would a food particle.
 Viral penetration: The viral capsid or genome is injected into the host cell's cytoplasm.

Through the use of green fluorescent protein (GFP), virus entry and infection can be visualized in real-time. Once a virus enters a cell, replication is not immediate and indeed takes some time (seconds to hours).

Entry via membrane fusion

The most well-known example is through membrane fusion. In a number of viruses with a viral envelope, viral receptors attach to the receptors on the surface of the cell and secondary receptors may be present to initiate the puncture of the membrane or fusion with the host cell. Following attachment, the viral envelope fuses with the host cell membrane, causing the virus to enter. Viruses that enter a cell in this manner included HIV, KSHV and herpes simplex virus.

In SARS-CoV-2 and similar viruses, entry occurs through membrane fusion mediated by the spike protein, either at the cell surface or in vesicles. Research efforts have focused on the spike protein's interaction with its cell-surface receptor, angiotensin-converting enzyme 2 (ACE2). The evolved, high level of activity to mediate cell to cell fusion has resulted in an enhanced fusion capacity. Inhibition of SARS-2 infection targets the spike proteins that harbor the capacity for membrane fusion. Vaccinations are based on the inhibition of spike (S) glycoprotein mediating the fusion of the virus and its host cell membranes. The fusion mechanism is also studied as a potential target for antiviral development.

Entry via endocytosis

Viruses with no viral envelope enter the cell generally through endocytosis; they are ingested by the host cell through the cell membrane. Cells can take in resources from the environment outside of the cell, and these mechanisms may be used by viruses to enter a cell in the same manner as ordinary resources. Once inside the cell, the virus leaves the vesicle by which it was taken up in order to gain access to the cytoplasm. Examples include the poliovirus, hepatitis C virus, and foot-and-mouth disease virus.

Many enveloped viruses, such as SARS-CoV-2, also enter the cell through endocytosis. Entry via the endosome guarantees low pH and exposure to proteases which are needed to open the viral capsid and release the genetic material inside. Further, endosomes transport the virus through the cell and ensure that no trace of the virus is left on the surface, which could be a substrate for immune recognition.

Entry via genetic injection
A third and more specific example, is by simply attaching to the surface of the cell via receptors on the cell, and injecting only its genome into the cell, leaving the rest of the virus on the surface. This is restricted to viruses in which only the genome is required for infection of a cell (for example positive-strand RNA viruses because they can be immediately translated) and further restricted to viruses that actually exhibit this behavior. The best studied example includes the bacteriophages; for example, when the tail fibers of the T2 phage land on a cell, its central sheath pierces the cell membrane and the phage injects DNA from the head capsid directly into the cell.

Aftermath
Once a virus is in a cell, it will activate formation of proteins (either by itself or using the host) to gain full control of the host cell, if it is able to.  Control mechanisms include the suppression of intrinsic cell defenses, suppression of cell signaling and suppression of host cellular transcription and translation.  Often, it is these cytotoxic effects that lead to the death and decline of a cell infected by a virus.

A cell is classified as susceptible to a virus if the virus is able to enter the cell.  After the introduction of the viral particle, unpacking of the contents (viral proteins in the tegument and the viral genome via some form of nucleic acid) occurs as preparation of the next stage of viral infection: viral replication.

References

Virology
Viral life cycle